Schwangau is a municipality  in the district of Ostallgäu in Bavaria, Germany. The village lies 4 km from the larger town of Füssen and just 1.5 km from Hohenschwangau, a collection of tourist-oriented facilities adjacent to the major tourist attractions of Schloss Neuschwanstein and Schloss Hohenschwangau.

Schwangau has no railway station, but is served by buses connecting to Füssen, Hohenschwangau, and other nearby Alpine towns. It is the next-to-last town on the Romantic Road tourist route that terminates in Füssen.

A castrum Swangowe is attested in 1090. It was situated on the site of Neuschwanstein Castle and was owned by the Elder House of Welf. 
After the death of Welf VI in 1191, it fell to the Staufer dynasty, and in 1268 to the empire.
The modern coat of arms is based on the one shown in the Codex Manesse as that of Hiltbolt of Schwangau (d. 1256), gules, a swan argent.

In the USA, the name "Swango" can be found. Presumably the name is descended from Swangowe, but possible genetic origins in a northern Italian family named Paumgarten or Baumgarten who bought the right to use the name from the Bavarian State after the death of Hiltbolt of Schwangau..

Gallery

References 

Ostallgäu